Mugoyo is a traditional main course dish in Uganda. It is served in most regions in Uganda and is defined as mingled. The main ingredients of the dish are sweet potatoes and beans.

Origins 

Mugoyo is popular in some communities in Uganda. The Iteso call it “emugoyo”, the Baganda refer to it as Mugoyo or Omugoyo which means it is mingled.

In Buganda, omugoyo has been associated with aging women because it is assumed only old women have the patience to prepare it due to the straining process. The common myth about omugoyo in Buganda is that two lovers are not supposed to serve each other omugoyo. It is believed that such an act would extinguish the fire and may even result in a failed relationship.

Recipes
The recipe for mugoyo consists of red kidney beans also known as Nambale and sweet potatoes.

Cooking Method 
The cooking process is started by boiling  dried red kidney beans known as Nambale with salt till tender. The dark purple sweet potatoes are then peeled and steamed in banana leaves till tender. The beans and sweet potatoes are  mashed together to form one dish.

Mugoyo is  prepared  over firewood where the smoke from the firewood adds a great taste to the mugoyo during the baking moment known as kubobeeza. Mugoyo can also be served with coffee or tea for breakfast. One would have cover it in plantains and momentarily roast it on the traditional Kiganda stove known as ekyoto.

See also
 Sweet Potatoes
 Beans
 Cuisine of Uganda
 List of African dishes 
 List of porridges

References

Kumusha
Ugandan cuisine
Legume dishes
Potato dishes
Breakfast dishes